In Canada, governments at the federal, provincial, territorial and municipal levels have the power to spend public funds. This is a list of governments by annual expenditures, in Canadian dollars.

Notes

Governments
Canada, annual expenditure
Canada by annual expenditure
Annual expenditure